Fitzcarraldo Editions is an independent British book publisher based in Deptford, London, specialising in literary fiction and long-form essays in both translation and English-language originals.  It focuses on ambitious, imaginative, and innovative writing by little-known authors. Fitzcarraldo Editions currently publishes twelve books a year. Three of Fitzcarraldo's authors have gone on to win the Nobel Prize in Literature: Svetlana Alexievich (2015), Olga Tokarczuk (2018) and Annie Ernaux (2022).

History 
Fitzcarraldo Editions was founded in 2014 when Jacques Testard bought the English-language rights to Second-Hand Time by Svetlana Alexievich for £3500 at the Frankfurt Book Fair. Alexievich later won the Nobel Prize, netting a "six-figure" sum for the publisher. The name comes from the 1982 Werner Herzog film Fitzcarraldo.

The books are designed by Ray O’Meara, using a custom serif typeface called Fitzcarraldo. Fitzcarraldo Editions publishes Svetlana Alexievich, Alejandro Zambra, Mathias Énard, Annie Ernaux, Joshua Cohen, Alaa Abd el-Fattah, Olga Tokarczuk, Jon Fosse, Fernanda Melchor, Ian Penman and Paul B. Preciado, among other authors.

References

External links
 Fitzcarraldo Editions website

2014 establishments in England
Book publishing companies based in London
British companies established in 2014